The Flower King is the third solo album by Roine Stolt. The original line-up for the album consisted of Stolt (vocals, electric guitar, bass guitar, keyboards), Jaime Salazar (drums), and Hasse Fröberg (vocals). They later formed the band The Flower Kings and released their debut album Back in the World of Adventures the following year.

Track listing

Personnel
Musicians
Roine Stolt – lead vocals (1-2,4,7-8), guitars, (all), bass guitar (1-3,5-8), keyboards (all), percussion (3-4,7-8) 
Hasse Fröberg – vocals (1,8)
Ulf Wallander – soprano saxophone (5,7)
Hasse Bruniusson – drums (3,5,7-8), percussion
Jaime Salazar – drums (1,2,6), percussion (2,6)
Dexter Frank Jr. (Roine Stolt) – keyboards, electronics
Don Azzaro (Roine Stolt) – bass guitar, Moog Taurus
Other credits
 Dexter Frank Jr. (Roine Stolt) – engineer

External links

References

1994 albums
Roine Stolt albums